Muhammad Abdul Muhith is a Bangladeshi diplomat. He is currently serving as the Permanent Representative of Bangladesh to the United Nations (UN) in New York. Prior to join here, he served as the Bangladesh ambassador to Austria with concurrent accreditation as ambassador to Hungary, Slovenia and Slovakia. He also serving as the Chair of the United Nations Peacebuilding Commission and as the President of the Executive Board of United Nations Entity for Gender Equality and Empowerment of Women (UN Women).

Early life 
Muhith completed BSS and MSS in Sociology from the University of Dhaka. He joined the Bangladesh Foreign Service in 1993 with 11th batch of BCS (FA) cadre. He did diploma in Arabic language from University of Kuwait.

Career 
Muhith has served in various Bangladesh missions including Second Secretary at Embassy of Bangladesh in Kuwait, First Secretary at Embassy of Bangladesh in Rome, Counsellor at Doha Embassy of Bangladesh, Counsellor at Permanent Mission of Bangladesh in New York. He was Deputy Chief of Mission, Embassy of Bangladesh in Washington D.C from 2012 to 2015. Then, he joined as an Ambassador of Bangladesh to Denmark with concurrent accreditation to Estonia and Iceland until 2020.

References 

Living people
1966 births
University of Dhaka alumni
Permanent Representatives of Bangladesh to the United Nations
Ambassadors of Bangladesh to Iceland
Ambassadors of Bangladesh to Denmark
Ambassadors of Bangladesh to Estonia